Bray is a town in Stephens County, Oklahoma, United States. The population was 1,209 at the 2010 census.

Geography
Bray is located at  (34.630587, −97.835246).

Climate

Demographics

As of the census of 2000, there were 1,035 people, 386 households, and 306 families residing in the town. The population density was 16.6 people per square mile (6.4/km2). There were 419 housing units at an average density of 6.7 per square mile (2.6/km2). The racial makeup of the town was 90.53% White, 0.10% African American, 5.60% Native American, 0.19% Asian, 0.68% from other races, and 2.90% from two or more races. Hispanic or Latino of any race were 2.22% of the population.

There were 386 households, out of which 31.9% had children under the age of 18 living with them, 69.2% were married couples living together, 6.0% had a female householder with no husband present, and 20.5% were non-families. 18.4% of all households were made up of individuals, and 7.3% had someone living alone who was 65 years of age or older. The average household size was 2.68 and the average family size was 3.00.

In the town, the population was spread out, with 25.6% under the age of 18, 8.3% from 18 to 24, 27.3% from 25 to 44, 26.8% from 45 to 64, and 12.0% who were 65 years of age or older. The median age was 38 years. For every 100 females, there were 102.1 males. For every 100 females age 18 and over, there were 101.0 males.

The median income for a household in the town was $29,417, and the median income for a family was $34,318. Males had a median income of $24,191 versus $20,658 for females. The per capita income for the town was $14,952. About 13.6% of families and 15.6% of the population were below the poverty line, including 20.2% of those under age 18 and 15.9% of those age 65 or over.

Notable person
Bray is the birthplace of country musician Katrina Elam.

References

External links
 Encyclopedia of Oklahoma History and Culture – Bray

Towns in Stephens County, Oklahoma
Towns in Oklahoma